Veclaicene Parish is an administrative unit of Alūksne Municipality, Latvia.

Geography 
Veclaicene parish has several small rivers —
Līčupe, 
and lakes —
Dzērve Lake, Ieva Lake, Lake Ilgājs, Koruļu Lake, Pilskalna Lake, Veclaicene Lake.

Towns, villages and settlements of Veclaicene Parish 

Parishes of Latvia
Alūksne Municipality